Owen Sound Billy Bishop Regional Airport or Billy Bishop Regional Airport, is located  east of Owen Sound, Ontario, Canada in the Municipality of Meaford. The airport is named for World War I flying ace Billy Bishop.

The airport is classified as an airport of entry by Nav Canada and is staffed by the Canada Border Services Agency (CBSA) on a call-out basis from the Waterloo International Airport on weekdays and the John C. Munro Hamilton International Airport on weekends. CBSA officers at this airport can handle general aviation aircraft only, with no more than 15 passengers.

In November 2009, the Toronto City Centre Airport renamed itself after Billy Bishop, creating confusion with this airport.

Services
The Owen Sound Billy Bishop Regional Airport is privately owned by Clayton Smith who purchased it from the City of Owen Sound on December 10, 2021.

Transportation

The airport is located along Ontario Highway 26. Parking is located next to the main airport building.

References

External links
 Official site

Registered aerodromes in Ontario
Transport in Owen Sound